Lance Corporal Richard Allen Anderson (16 April 1948 – 24 August 1969) was a United States Marine who was awarded the Medal of Honor posthumously for his heroic actions above and beyond the call of duty in August 1969 during the Vietnam War.

On 24 August 1969, Anderson's platoon was ambushed near Vandegrift Combat Base in Quang Tri Province. Anderson was wounded early in the skirmish, but delivered suppressing fire on the North Vietnamese forces. When a militant threw a grenade at the American forces, Anderson threw himself on it and saved the life of another Marine.

Biography
Anderson was born on 16 April 1948, in Washington, D.C. At an early age, he moved with his parents to Houston, Texas. He graduated from M.B. Smiley High School there in May 1966, then attended San Jacinto Junior College in Pasadena, Texas, for a year and a half.

Anderson enlisted in the Marine Corps in Houston on 8 April 1968. Upon completion of recruit training with the 2d Recruit Training Battalion, Marine Corps Recruit Depot, San Diego, California, he received individual combat training with the 1st Battalion, 2d Infantry Training Regiment, Marine Corps Base, Camp Pendleton, California, and returned to San Diego to attend Sea School. He was promoted to Private First Class (PFC) effective 1 July 1968.

PFC Anderson completed his training in October 1968, and was ordered to the Far East, where he joined Sub Unit #1, Provisional Service Battalion, 9th Marine Amphibious Brigade.

In November 1968, he was reassigned duty with the 3rd Marine Division in the Republic of Vietnam, and served initially as a rifleman with Company D, 1st Battalion, 4th Marines. In January 1969, he assumed duty as scout and, later, Assistant Fire Team Leader with Company E, 3rd Reconnaissance Battalion, 3rd Marine Division. He was promoted to Lance Corporal effective 1 June 1969.

On 24 August 1969, while participating in combat approximately 12 miles northwest of Vandegrift Combat Base in Quang Tri Province, he was killed in action.

Military awards
Anderson's military decorations and awards include:

Medal of Honor citation

The President of the United States in the name of United States Congress takes pride in presenting the MEDAL OF HONOR posthumously to

for service as set forth in the following

CITATION:

See also

List of Medal of Honor recipients
List of Medal of Honor recipients for the Vietnam War

References

External links

1948 births
1969 deaths
American military personnel killed in the Vietnam War
United States Marine Corps Medal of Honor recipients
Military personnel from Houston
United States Marines
Vietnam War recipients of the Medal of Honor
Deaths by hand grenade
United States Marine Corps personnel of the Vietnam War